The 1950 Lafayette Leopards football team was an American football team that represented Lafayette College in the Middle Three Conference during the 1950 college football season. In its second season under head coach Maurice J. "Clipper" Smith, the team compiled a 1–8 record. Jay Barclay and Joseph Diamond were the team captains. The team played its home games at Fisher Field in Easton, Pennsylvania.

Schedule

References

Lafayette
Lafayette Leopards football seasons
Lafayette Leopards football